Cryptopygus elegans is a species of springtails found in Argentina.

References

External links 

 
 
 collembola.org (anurinae)

Entomobryomorpha
Animals described in 1962
Arthropods of Argentina